The Visconti-Castelbarco Castle is a castle of mediaeval origin located in Cislago, Lombardy, Northern Italy. Since the 13th century it belonged to a cadet branch of the Visconti House. In the 18th century it became a property of the Castelbarco family.

History
On the site of the current castle, a fortification had been existing at least since the 10th century. At the end of the 13th century the castle became a property of the Visconti of Milan. It was then inherited by a lineage originated by Uberto, brother of Matteo Lord of Milan, initially the Visconti di Somma and later the Visconti di Cislago.

Destroyed in the 17th century, it was raised again in the form of a baroque villa on the original U-shaped plan and with two towers at the corners of the main facade. A crenellated roof was added to the building, providing the current revival castle aspect.

The castle belonged to the Visconti di Cislago until the 18th century. The marriage of the last female member of the Visconti di Cislago to a Castelbarco led the castle in the hands of the bridegroom's family. Their descendants assumed the surname of Castelbarco-Visconti.

Today
The castle today is a private estate. A municipal park, Giardino Castelbarco, facing the front of the castle, is open to the public.

References

External links
 Castello Visconti - Cislago (VA)
 Comune di Cislago - Il castello Visconti-Castelbarco
 Varese Land of Tourism - The Visconti castle
 ICastelli.it, Castelli & Torri d'Italia - Castello Visconteo Di Cislago

Castles in Lombardy